Sawicki (feminine Sawicka, plural Sawiccy) is a Polish surname. Other language equivalents:

People
 Agata Sawicka (born 1985), Polish volleyball player
 Beata Dorota Sawicka (born 1964), Polish politician
 Hanna Sawicka (1917–1943), Polish-Jewish communist
 Irena Sawicka (educator) (1890–1994), Polish educator and WWII resistance member
 Jaclyn Sawicki (born 1992), footballer
 Janet Sawicki, American cancer researcher
 Joan Sawicki (born 1945), Canadian politician
 Marek Sawicki (born 1958), Polish politician
 Olga Sawicka (1932–2015), Polish dancer
 Wojciech Sawicki (born 1955), Secretary General of the Parliamentary Assembly of the Council of Europe
 Wiktor Sawicki, Polish runner

See also
 
 

Polish-language surnames